Ronnie Foster (born May 12, 1950) is an American funk and soul jazz organist, and record producer.  His albums recorded for Blue Note Records in the 1970s have gained a cult following after the emergence of acid jazz.

Early life
Foster was born in Buffalo, New York, on May 12, 1950. He attended Public 
School 8, Woodlawn Jr. High for a year, McKinley Vocational High School for two years, and then spent his final year at Lafayette High School. The only formal musical instruction he received was a month of accordion lessons. He was attracted to music at the age of four, took it more seriously from his early teens, and had his first professional gig aged fifteen, playing in a strip club.

Later life and career
Foster initially performed with other local musicians. He moved to New York City with his own band, and acquired a publishing company. Foster has performed as a sideman with a wide range of musicians. He frequently worked with guitarist George Benson, including  playing on the guitarist's album Breezin'. Foster has also played organ with Grant Green, Grover Washington, Jr., Stanley Turrentine, Roberta Flack, Earl Klugh, Harvey Mason, Jimmy Smith, and Stevie Wonder. He is also a record producer. Ronnie Foster's song "Mystic Brew" was sampled in Electric Relaxation by A Tribe Called Quest as well as later in J. Cole's song Forbidden Fruit. Later in 2016, J. Cole confirmed that the song "Mystic Brew" was reversed, pitched, and slowed down in the song Neighbors as well as the instrumental of Forbidden Fruit.

Discography 
Two Headed Freap (Blue Note, 1972)
Sweet Revival (Blue Note, 1972)
Ronnie Foster Live: Cookin' with Blue Note at Montreux (Blue Note, 1973)
On the Avenue (Blue Note, 1974)
Cheshire Cat (Blue Note, 1975)
Love Satellite (Columbia, 1978)
Delight (Columbia, 1979)
The Racer (Pro Jazz, 1986)
Reboot (Blue Note, 2022)

As sideman 

With George Benson
 Good King Bad (CTI, 1975)
 In Concert-Carnegie Hall (CTI, 1975)
 Breezin' (Warner Bros., 1976)
 In Flight (Warner Bros., 1977)
 Weekend in L.A. (Warner Bros., 1977)
 Livin' Inside Your Love (Warner Bros., 1979)

With Chayanne
 Chayanne (CBS, 1987)
 Chayanne (CBS, 1988)

With Grant Green
 Alive! (Blue Note, 1970) – live
 Live at Club Mozambique (Blue Note, 2006) – rec. 1971

With others
 Chet Atkins, Street Dreams (Columbia, 1986)
 The Jacksons, Triumph (Epic, 1980)
 Robbie Robertson, Storyville (Geffen, 1991)
 Stanley Turrentine, Wonderland (Blue Note, 1987) – rec. 1986
 Stevie Wonder, Songs in the Key of Life (Tamla, 1976)
 Grover Washington Jr., Time Out of Mind (Columbia, 1989)

References

External links

1950 births
Living people
Soul-jazz musicians
American jazz organists
American male organists
Record producers from New York (state)
Musicians from Buffalo, New York
Blue Note Records artists
Columbia Records artists
Jazz musicians from New York (state)
21st-century organists
21st-century American male musicians
American male jazz musicians
21st-century American keyboardists
Lafayette High School (Buffalo, New York) alumni
21st-century African-American musicians
20th-century African-American people